The 21st annual Venice International Film Festival was held from 24 August to 7 September 1960.

Jury
 Marcel Achard (France) (head of jury)
 Peter Baker (UK)
 Luis García Berlanga (Spain) 
 Sergei Bondarchuk (Soviet Union)
 Louis Chauvet (France)
 Antonio Pagliaro (Italy)
 Jaime Potenze (Argentina)
 Mario Praz (Italy)
 Samuel Steinman (USA)
 Jerzy Toeplitz (Poland)
 Arturo Tofanelli (Italy)

Films in competition

Awards
Golden Lion:
Tomorrow Is My Turn (André Cayatte)
Special Jury Prize:
Rocco and His Brothers (Luchino Visconti)
Volpi Cup:
 Best Actor - John Mills - (Tunes of Glory)
 Best Actress - Shirley MacLaine  - (The Apartment)
Best First Work
Long Night in 1943 (Florestano Vancini)
San Giorgio Prize
The Human Condition: No Greater Love (Masaki Kobayashi)
FIPRESCI Prize
El Cochecito (Marco Ferreri)
Rocco and His Brothers (Luchino Visconti)
OCIC Award
Stowaway in the Sky (Albert Lamorisse)
Pasinetti Award
The Human Condition: No Greater Love (Masaki Kobayashi)
Parallel Sections - Shadows (John Cassavetes)
Lion of San Marco
The Musicians (Kazimierz Karabasz)

References

External links
 
 Venice Film Festival 1960 Awards on IMDb

Venice International Film Festival
Venice International Film Festival
Venice Film Festival
Film
Venice International Film Festival
Venice International Film Festival